FC-75 is a fluorocarbon derivative of tetrahydrofuran with the chemical formula C8F16O. It is practically insoluble in water.

It is one of the 3M Fluorinert fluids. It is used as an inert coolant fluid in electronics and other applications, and as a solvent. FC-75 can be synthesized by the same electrochemical fluorination process used to produce PFOA. However, other perfluorinated ether isomers will also result.
H(CH2)7COCl + HF → H(CH2)7COF + C7H16 + 2C8F16O + HCl + H2

A similar fluorocarbon-based coolant and solvent is perfluorohexane.

References

Coolants
Halogenated solvents
Perfluorinated compounds
Tetrahydrofurans